Jürgen Beck (born 29 August 1963) is a German curler.

At the national level, he is a German men's champion curler (2003).

Teams

References

External links

Living people
1963 births
German male curlers

Place of birth missing (living people)